Bhuleshwar (Old spelling Bholeśvar) is a neighbourhood in Mumbai. It is situated in South Mumbai and to the north of the Fort area. It is known for being home to over 100 temples  including Mumba Devi Temple of Mumbai, the patron goddess of the city of Mumbai and Swaminarayan Mandir. It has a large Gujarati population. The area is also known for the Bhuleshwar Market for fruit and vegetable and is surrounded a number of old markets, like the Crawford Market for fruits and vegetables, Mangaldas Market for silk and cloth, Zaveri Bazaar, the famous jewellery and diamond market and Chor Bazaar, a noted market for antiques and furniture.

Its near by areas are Kalbadevi, Girgaon, Princess Street and Mandvi.

The former residence of Dhirubhai Ambani and family is also in Bhuleshwar, where they lived till the 1960s.

The guide and historical study book, Alice in Bhuleshwar about the locality was published in 2009.

See also
Shri Swaminarayan Mandir, Mumbai

References 

 Alice in Bhuleshwar: Navigating a Mumbai Neighbourhood, by Kaiwan Mehta. Yoda Press, 2009. .

Neighbourhoods in Mumbai
Tourist attractions in Mumbai